, commonly known by her given name, is a Japanese politician and former journalist who is a current member of House of Councillors. She was the leader of the now-defunct major Japanese opposition party, the Democratic Party.

Early and personal life
Born Hsieh Lien-fang in Tokyo to a Japanese mother and Taiwanese father, she studied at Aoyama Gakuin in Tokyo from kindergarten through university. She enrolled in the law faculty of Aoyama Gakuin University and graduated in 1990 with the B.L. degree in Public Law. 

Born as a citizen of the Republic of China, she did not become a citizen of Japan until 1985 when the Nationality Law was amended to allow Japanese mothers to pass Japanese nationality to their children. She was legally a dual citizen until 2016. She adopted her mother's surname, when she acquired Japanese citizenship; to avoid name confusion in her career, she began to go simply by Renhō.

After her debut as a Clarion Girl in 1988, Renhō appeared on several television and radio programs as a commentator. In 1993, she became a newscaster on TBS and TV Asahi, covering several historical events including the Great Hanshin earthquake.

She was married in 1993 and studied the Chinese language at Peking University from 1995 to 1997. Renhō returned to television in 2000, anchoring and reporting on several TBS programs. She reported from Taiwan during Chen Shui-bian's presidential campaign, which brought her to the attention of Taiwanese political leaders. In Taiwan, she is often referred to as Lien-fang, the Standard Chinese pronunciation of her given name.

Political career
In July 2004, Renhō was elected to the House of Councillors representing Tokyo as a member of the Democratic Party of Japan. Since election, she has been heavily involved in parenting issues and policies. Renhō has criticized Japan's diplomacy with the People's Republic of China and its refusal to recognize Taiwan, stating that "Japan is too polite when dealing with China, taking a low profile" and "Taiwan is my father's country. Why isn't Taiwan a country?" Since taking office, she has traveled to Taiwan several times on official and unofficial business, garnering extensive public and media attention, and has become close to senior members of the Democratic Progressive Party.

DPJ government (2009–12) 
After the DPJ assumed the reins of government in September 2009, she received much public attention for her stern stance and direct questions to bureaucrats during special fiscal screening committees of the  established under Yukio Hatoyama.

In June 2010, then Prime Minister Naoto Kan appointed her as Minister for Administrative Reforms. Upon taking the post, Renhō stated that she would be giving particular attention to eliminating waste in the 21 government account. She lost her seat in Cabinet in a subsequent reshuffle, but was retained as a special advisor to the Prime Minister.

In the 2010 House of Councillors election, she garnered a record 1,710,734 constituency votes.

She served as a member of the Cabinet of Japan from 2010 to 2012, serving as Minister for Government Revitalisation and Minister of State for Consumer Affairs and Food Safety. In September 2011, she was re-appointed as State Minister of Government Revitalization (responsible for administrative reforms) in the cabinet of then prime minister Yoshihiko Noda. Her new portfolio also included responsibility for civil service reform, gender equality and Japan's declining birthrate. She served in this post until a cabinet reshuffle in January 2012.

The DPJ was ousted from government in the 2012 general election, following which Renhō returned to the opposition bench. She retained her seat in the 2016 House of Councillors Election.

Head of the Democratic Party (2016–17) 
In September 2016, she was elected as the leader of Japan's Democratic Party, making her the first woman elected as their leader, and the first person with mixed ethnic heritage and born with foreign citizenship to head a major political party in Japan. As head of the Democratic Party, she stated her opposition to revisions of Article 9 of the Constitution, but that she was willing to join debates with the Liberal Democratic Party on other constitutional revisions. She viewed Abenomics to be a partial success, but pushes for greater investment in education, child-rearing and nursing care. She also ruled out forming a coalition government with the Japanese Communist Party and opposed the Trans-Pacific Partnership.

During the presidential election, Renhō claimed that she had given up her Taiwanese citizenship. However, reports emerged that her Taiwanese citizenship had not been properly renounced. In response to doubts regarding her legal status, she took steps to renounce her Taiwanese citizenship beginning in late 2016.

In July 2017, the Democratic Party suffered a very poor showing in the Tokyo prefectural election. Some senior party members blamed the results, in part, on the ongoing questions surrounding Renhō's citizenship. In response to these concerns, she provided evidence of her renunciation of Taiwanese citizenship at a press conference later that month. Days after her press conference, and days following the resignation of former prime minister Yoshihiko Noda as party secretary-general, Renhō resigned as head of the party, stating that she had not shown sufficient ability to lead it.

In the CDP (2017–) 
Dissatisfied with the ambiguous direction of the DP leadership post the 2017 election, Renho expressed interest in joining the new progressive Constitutional Democratic Party and had an exploratory talk with CDP leader Yukio Edano in mid-December. She applied to join the CDP on December 26, 2017 citing the DP's lack of policy directions and the CDP's conversely clear policy directions. The CDP admitted her into the party on December 28, 2017.

Family 
Renho married journalist  in August 1993, and gave birth to fraternal twins Rin (a boy) and Suiran (a girl) in 1997; Rin went on to become a male "idol" performer. The couple divorced by mutual consent in August 2020. According to her ex-husband, Renho proposed the divorce as she wanted to stay in Tokyo and continue her political work, while her husband wanted to move out of the city. Following the divorce, her ex-husband told a television reporter that "our relationship hasn't changed; we just don't live together."

Renho has two siblings, one brother who is one year older, and one brother who is two years younger. Mark Chen, a Taiwanese politician and former Secretary-General of the Office of the President of the Republic of China, is a distant relative of hers.

References

External links 
 
 Renhō profile at DPJ site

1967 births
Constitutional Democratic Party of Japan politicians
Democratic Party of Japan politicians
Female members of the House of Councillors (Japan)
Women government ministers of Japan
Government ministers of Japan
Japanese actor-politicians
Japanese actresses
Japanese people of Taiwanese descent
Japanese television personalities
Living people
Members of the House of Councillors (Japan)
Politicians from Tokyo
Japanese television journalists
Japanese broadcast news analysts
21st-century Japanese politicians
21st-century Japanese women politicians
Women television journalists
Women opposition leaders